Samsung SPH-M100 (UpRoar) launched in 2000 was the first cell phone to have MP3 music capabilities. The phone was named one of the All-TIME 100 greatest and most influential gadgets from 1923 to 2010 by Peter Ha in Time.

References

External links
GSM History - reference site for history of first GSM mobiles
Samsung website product details

M100
Mobile phones introduced in 2000